The Men's artistic team all-around event took place on 4 October 2010 at the Indira Gandhi Arena. Australia won gold with 259.050 points, England finished on 256.750 with Canada third on 248.500 ahead of New Zealand and Wales.

Results

References

External links
Reports

Gymnastics at the 2010 Commonwealth Games